Best Hip Hop Artist and Best Soul/RnB Artist are two Aotearoa Music Awards that honour New Zealand music artists for outstanding recordings of the genres of hip hop, and soul or R&B. The award was first awarded in 2002 as Best R&B/Hip Hop Album, and in 2003 it was called Best Urban Album. In 2004 it moved to Best Urban/Hip Hop Album. In 2017 the award was split into two separate awards: Best Hip Hop Artist and Best Soul/RnB Artist. The entry criteria were also changed to require either an album or a minimum of five single releases in the eligibility period.

Controversy 

In 2016, the award was presented to Aaradhna her album Brown Girl. She refused to accept the award, saying she felt the inclusion of both R&B music and hip hop in the same "urban" category was due to racial stereotyping and that she felt as a pop/R&B artist, she shouldn't be in the same category as hip hop acts. Aaradhna informally awarded the Tui to fellow nominee SWIDT for their album SmokeyGotBeatz Presents SWIDT vs EVERYBODY. Recorded Music NZ still lists Aaradhna as the winner of the category.

Recorded Music NZ CEO Damian Vaughan responded to the incident, saying that "urban" was an industry term used by New Zealand radio, but that the Urban/Hip Hop category would be reevaluated before the 2017 awards. As a result, the Best Urban/Hip Hop Album category was reevaluated ahead of the 2017 New Zealand Music Awards. The award was split into two genre categories: Best Hip Hop Artist and Best Soul/RnB Artist.

Recipients

Best R&B/Hip Hop Album (2002)

Best Urban Album (2003)

Best Urban/Hip Hop Album (2004 to 2016)

Best Hip Hop Artist (2017 to current)

Best Soul/RnB Artist (2017 to current)

References

Best Urban Hip Hop Album
Hip hop awards
Awards established in 2002
2002 establishments in New Zealand